Ahmed Abdo Mustafa (born 1946) is a Sudanese footballer. He competed in the 1972 Summer Olympics.

References

1946 births
Living people
Footballers at the 1972 Summer Olympics
Sudanese footballers
Olympic footballers of Sudan
Al-Hilal Club (Omdurman) players
Association football forwards